King Jeonggan (1021–1069; born Wang Gi) was a Goryeo Royal Prince as the 5th son of King Hyeonjong, from Queen Wonhye. He was a brother to King Munjong and Queen Hyosa, also became both of paternal uncle and father-in-law to King Sunjong. He was known as Duke Pyeongyang and Duke of the Gaeseong State during his lifetime.

The Prince was born in 1021 (12th year reign of his father) at Yeondeok Palace (연덕궁), his mother's official residence with the name of "Wang Gi" (왕기, 王基). Through his parent, he became both of paternal half younger brother and maternal first cousin to Wang Heum and Wang Hyeong. In 1031, Gi was appointed as Honginsunghyogwangdeokgongsin Sutaewi Sangseoryeong (홍인숭효광덕공신 수태위 겸 상서령, 弘仁崇孝光德功臣 守太尉兼尙書令) and honoured as Duke of the Gaeseong State (개성국공, 開城國公) while three years later became a Sutaebo (수태보, 守太保) during the first year reign of King Jeongjong.

At the beginning of King Munjong's year, Gi started fell ill and the king then sent an Eoui (어의) to take care of his younger brother. In 1049, Gi  became Sutaesa Naesaryeong (수태사 겸 내사령, 守太師 內史令) and then became Jungseoryeong (중서령, 中書令) in 1061. On his birthday, it was said that he was given a Royal Ceremonial Service (예폐, 禮幣) and honoured as Duke Pyeongyang (평양공, 平壤公). However, he later died in 1069 due to his illness and then honoured as King Jeonggan (정간왕, 靖簡王).

In 1072, "Gyowi" (교위, 校尉), "Geosin" (거신, 巨身) and others who did a conspiracy case of an attempt to abolished Munjong and established Gi as the new king, were discovered and executed, while his eldest son, Wang Jin got exiled to the Haenam. Beside Jin, Duke Pyeongyang also had 2 other sons (Wang Geo and Wang Yeong) and a daughter who would marry King Sunjong.

Family 
Father: Hyeonjong of Goryeo (고려현종, 1 August 992 – 17 June 1031, r. 1009–1031)
Paternal Grandfather: Anjong of Goryeo (고려 안종)
Paternal Grandmother: Queen Dowager Hyosuk (효숙왕태후)
Mother: Queen Wonhye of the Ansan Gim clan (원혜왕후 김씨; d. 1022)
Maternal Grandfather: Gim Eun-bu (김은부) 
Maternal Grandmother: Lady Yi, of the Incheon Yi clan (인천 이씨)
Consorts and their Respective issue(s):
Unknown Queen
Wang Jin (왕진, d.1075), first son
Wang Geo (왕거), second son
Wang Yeon (낙랑공 왕영, 1043 – 1112), Prince Nakrang, third son
Queen Jeongui of the Gaeseong Wang clan (정의왕후 왕씨), first daughter

References

Duke Pyeongyang on Encykorea .
평양공 on Doosan Encyclopedia .
Duke Pyeongyang on Goryeosa .

Korean princes
1021 births
1069 deaths
11th-century Korean people